Aloysius Paulus Maria "Louis" van Gaal (born 8 August 1951) is a Dutch former football player and manager. At club level, he served as manager of Ajax, Barcelona, AZ Alkmaar, Bayern Munich and Manchester United, as well as having three spells in charge of the Netherlands national team. Van Gaal is one of the greatest and  most decorated managers in world football, having won 20 major honours in his managerial career. He is sometimes nicknamed the "Iron Tulip".

Before his career as a coach, Van Gaal played as a midfielder for Royal Antwerp, Telstar, Sparta Rotterdam, Ajax and AZ Alkmaar. He is also a qualified physical education teacher, and worked at high schools during his career as a semi-professional footballer. After a brief spell as an assistant coach at AZ, Van Gaal served as an assistant under Leo Beenhakker at Ajax, and eventually took over as head coach in 1991. Under his lead, the club won three Eredivisie titles, the UEFA Cup and the UEFA Champions League. He moved to Barcelona in 1997 and won two league titles and one Copa del Rey, but left after disagreements with the club's hierarchy.

Van Gaal was then appointed at the Netherlands, but failed to qualify for the 2002 FIFA World Cup. This preceded another brief spell at Barcelona, before he returned to AZ, where he won an Eredivisie title, the club's second ever in its history. He moved to Bayern Munich in 2009, and in Germany won the Bundesliga, the DFB-Pokal and reached the final of the UEFA Champions League. He returned to manage the Netherlands for a second time, where he led the nation to a third-place finish at the 2014 FIFA World Cup. He was hired by Manchester United later that summer, where he won the FA Cup, before being dismissed in 2016. Despite announcing his retirement due to family reasons in 2019, Van Gaal returned to management in August 2021, when he was appointed as head coach of the Netherlands for a third time.

Playing and early coaching career
Van Gaal was born in Amsterdam. As a youngster, he started playing for the Amsterdam amateur side RKSV de Meer. At the age of 20, he joined the second team of Ajax, but was never chosen to play in the first team, which at the time boasted players such as Johan Cruyff and Johan Neeskens in the midfield positions. He was loaned to Belgian First Division side Royal Antwerp playing under Guy Thys with whom he was runner-up in the Belgian top division in 1974 and 1975. During his time with Antwerp, Van Gaal suffered a broken nose in a friendly against K.V. Kortrijk. After four years spent in Belgium, he returned to his homeland and made his Eredivisie debut for Telstar under the guidance of manager, Mircea Petescu, whom he followed to Sparta Rotterdam. He later joined AZ, where he also became assistant coach in 1986. After a short career at AZ, he returned to Ajax to become Leo Beenhakker's assistant. When Beenhakker left in 1991, Van Gaal took over as manager.

Management career

Ajax (1991–1997)

Van Gaal was Ajax manager from 1991 until 1997 and had a very successful tenure. Under Van Gaal, Ajax became the Eredivisie champions three times, in 1994, 1995 (notably going the entire 1994–95 season unbeaten in both the league and the Champions League) and 1996. He also led Ajax to the KNVB Cup in 1993 and the Johan Cruyff Shield in 1993, 1994, and 1995. On the European scene, Ajax captured the UEFA Cup in 1992 and the UEFA Champions League in 1995 after beating Milan in the final. The latter win was followed by a 5–1 aggregate win over Real Zaragoza in the 1995 UEFA Super Cup. Late in 1995, Ajax beat Brazilian side Grêmio on penalties to win the Intercontinental Cup. Ajax were also Champions League runners-up in 1996 after losing to Juventus on penalties.

Ajax was so successful under Van Gaal's leadership that during the 1990s, the Netherlands national team was dominated by Ajax players such as Patrick Kluivert, Marc Overmars, Dennis Bergkamp, Frank and Ronald de Boer, Edgar Davids, Clarence Seedorf, Winston Bogarde, Michael Reiziger, and Edwin van der Sar.

After serving out his contract at Ajax in 1997, Van Gaal received his knighthood in the Order of Orange-Nassau.

Barcelona (1997–2000)
Van Gaal moved to Barcelona in 1997, taking over from Bobby Robson, and helped the team win two La Liga titles (1997–98, 1998–99) and the Copa del Rey once. Despite this success, he clashed with the media and came under criticism. He expressed that it was difficult to implement his football philosophy at Barcelona due to cultural differences, and that he struggled hard as some players were unwilling to follow his lead. His rows with Rivaldo are an example of this: Van Gaal insisted Rivaldo play as a left winger, whereas Rivaldo argued that he wanted to play in the centre, in effect undermining Van Gaal.

Van Gaal eventually left the Catalan side on 20 May 2000, days after losing the league title to Deportivo de La Coruña, uttering the immortal line, "Amigos de la prensa. Yo me voy. Felicidades." ("Friends of the press. I am leaving. Congratulations.") He returned to the Netherlands to manage the Netherlands national team in preparation for the 2002 FIFA World Cup.

Netherlands national team (2000–2002)
Under Van Gaal, the Netherlands started their campaign to qualify for the 2002 World Cup poorly. Placed in Group 2, an injury-hit side could only manage to secure a late 2–2 draw at home to the Republic of Ireland, having been 2–0 down with 20 minutes to go. A 4–0 win over Cyprus was followed by a 2–0 defeat to Portugal.

In 2001, the Netherlands beat Andorra, Cyprus and Estonia, but despite leading group leaders Portugal 2–0 with seven minutes left, drew 2–2 and fell three points behind second-place Republic of Ireland, who were unbeaten. When the sides met in Dublin, Van Gaal boasted before the match that his squad was so much more talented, even the Irish fans would want them to qualify. Ireland went down to ten men after 58 minutes but scored nine minutes later and won 1–0. The Netherlands fell seven points behind them with two games left to play, meaning that they failed to qualify for the World Cup for the first time since 1986. Van Gaal stepped down as manager on 31 January 2002 to be replaced by Dick Advocaat. After this, speculation began that Van Gaal would succeed Sir Alex Ferguson at Manchester United once Ferguson claimed he would retire that year. According to Van Gaal, Ferguson decided against retiring and the deal fell through.

Return to Barcelona (2002–2003)
Van Gaal returned to Barcelona for the start of the 2002–03 season on a contract until June 2005, but results were inconsistent. The club won a record-equalling ten successive matches in the Champions League but struggled in La Liga. After four wins, four draws and three defeats from their opening 11 league matches, Barcelona lost three matches in a row, to Real Sociedad, relegation-threatened Rayo Vallecano and Sevilla. Two wins and a draw improved things but after successive defeats to Valencia and Celta de Vigo, he left by mutual consent on 28 January 2003 with the club in 12th place, just three points above the relegation zone and 20 points behind leaders Real Sociedad.

His transfers, particularly the signings of goalkeeper Robert Enke, midfielder Gaizka Mendieta and playmaker Juan Román Riquelme, all disappointed. Riquelme had been bought to replace Rivaldo, whom Van Gaal had released on a free transfer despite having a year left on his contract. The two had fallen out during Van Gaal's previous tenure and after Van Gaal returned, Rivaldo said, "Van Gaal is the main cause of my departure. I don't like Van Gaal, and I am sure that he doesn't like me, either." Van Gaal replied that Rivaldo's lack of commitment was the reason he was released, saying that he "was only interested in making more money and playing less. He was chosen as the best player in 1999, but he has not handled himself well since then and has not behaved like a footballer should. He had illusions about Barca and was requesting to take holidays when important Champions League games were approaching. He then hides back home in Brazil. He plays for Brazil like we needed him to at Barcelona, and he has proved this in the World Cup finals, showing he reserved himself for Japan." Rivaldo joined A.C. Milan and won that season's Champions League. However due to his poor performances throughout the season, he won the Bidone d'Oro Award in 2003, which is given to the worst Serie A player during a particular season

Return to Ajax (2004)
In 2004, Van Gaal returned to Ajax as a technical director, but resigned later that year due to an internal conflict with Ronald Koeman.

AZ (2005–2009)

In January 2005, it was announced that Van Gaal would replace Co Adriaanse as AZ manager on 1 July 2005. Under Van Gaal, AZ finished second in the Eredivisie in 2005–06 and third in 2006–07. Van Gaal also led AZ to a runners-up finish in the 2006–07 KNVB Cup and lost a 2007–08 Champions League qualification play-off to Ajax 4–2 on aggregate.

Van Gaal initially announced he would leave AZ at the end of the 2007–08 season due to disappointing results, with the club finishing 11th in the Eredivisie. When several players of the AZ squad said that they would like him to stay with AZ, however, Van Gaal said he would give the players a chance to prove themselves.

AZ started the 2008–09 season with two losses: 2–1 to NAC Breda and 0–3 to ADO Den Haag, but after that the Alkmaar-based club remained unbeaten until 18 April, topping the table ahead of Twente and Ajax for the entire season, despite being predicted to finish as low as 13th by pundits. AZ had the best defensive record in the Eredivisie and the second-best goalscoring record, behind Ajax, thanks to its offensive duo of league topscorer Mounir El Hamdaoui and Brazilian Ari. They were crowned league champions on 19 April, one day after AZ suffered an unexpected loss at home to Vitesse, which ended a string of 28 unbeaten games (surpassing the team's 1980–81 record of 25 unbeaten games). That same day Ajax, the only opponent still in theory able to surpass AZ, lost 6–2 to PSV.

Bayern Munich (2009–2011)

On 1 July 2009, Van Gaal took over as coach of Bayern Munich. He referred to his new employer as a "dream club". On 28 August 2009, he strengthened his team by signing compatriot Arjen Robben from Real Madrid; this reunited the two, with Van Gaal selecting Robben for his debut in the Netherlands U20 team.

Van Gaal got off to a poor start as Bayern coach, winning only one of his first four matches in charge, and by November the club was on the brink of a Champions League group stage exit following two losses to Bordeaux. With Bayer Leverkusen at the top of the Bundesliga, speculation was rampant that he was on the brink of a departure from Bayern even earlier than his predecessor Jürgen Klinsmann. Van Gaal, however, kept insisting he is a "prozesstrainer", meaning that his team needs time to play the way he imagines.

Van Gaal installed many youth players as fixtures in the starting 11, including Thomas Müller and Holger Badstuber, and also converted the winger Bastian Schweinsteiger into a defensive midfielder. A feud with Italian striker Luca Toni, who had played an important role in Bayern's 2007–08 league and cup double, led to Toni's move to Roma. Bayern Munich's form, however, improved with two Champions League victories including an impressive 4–1 victory over Juventus in Turin, which allowed them to progress from their group in second position behind Bordeaux. By March, Bayern had moved to the semi-finals of the DFB-Pokal and were top of the Bundesliga, ahead of Bayer Leverkusen.

On 8 May 2010, Bayern were crowned Bundesliga champions following a 3–1 win at Hertha BSC, making Van Gaal the first ever Dutch coach to win the Bundesliga. On 15 May 2010, Bayern won the DFB-Pokal with a 4–0 victory over Werder Bremen, thus securing the domestic double.

In the Champions League, Bayern won 4–4 on the away goals rule in the quarter-final against Manchester United and 4–0 on aggregate against Lyon in the semi-final, securing them a spot in the final, where Van Gaal was to meet his former pupil and assistant at Barcelona, Internazionale coach José Mourinho. Bayern, however, lost the final 2–0, handing Inter a first Italian treble and thus failing to secure the treble themselves. On 25 May 2010, Karl-Heinz Rummenigge expressed his desire to extend Van Gaal's contract as the club was very happy with his performance, despite Van Gaal still having one year of his contract to fulfil. At the end of the season, Van Gaal was voted Manager of the Year in the yearly poll organized by VDV (professional players' union in Germany) and German magazine kicker.

Van Gaal's Bayern started the 2010–11 season by winning the DFL-Supercup, which had been officially reinstated after a 14-year absence.

On 7 March 2011, Bayern Munich declared that Van Gaal's contract was to be cancelled after the end of the 2010–11 season. However, he was instead sacked on 10 April 2011 after losing the third place in the Bundesliga.

Return to Netherlands national team (2012–2014)

On 6 July 2012, Van Gaal was presented as the new Netherlands coach. "I am happy that the KNVB approached me", said Van Gaal, who was assisted by former Dutch internationals Danny Blind and Patrick Kluivert, both part of his successful Ajax squad from 1995. "This is the challenge which I have been waiting for."

Van Gaal led the Netherlands through its 2014 World Cup qualification group as the team won nine and drew one of their ten matches with a goal difference of 34–5. Qualification was secured with two matches to spare, following a 2–0 away win against Andorra on 10 September 2013.

Despite their successful qualifying campaign, expectations surrounding the Netherlands national team were comparatively low due to mixed pre-tournament friendly performances and the failure of the Dutch squad in Euro 2012, where they suffered three defeats out of three in the group stages in that tournament. In their first group game at the World Cup, at the Estádio Fonte Nova in Salvador, however, Van Gaal's Dutch team came from behind to defeat reigning champions Spain 5–1. The Dutch victory over Spain was attributed in part to Van Gaal's use of counter-attacking tactics which disrupted the tiki-taka possession-based football of the Spanish team. His use of a 3–5–2 formation was notable, as opposed to the typical Dutch 4–3–3 and this helped the Netherlands to tactically take advantage of Spain's weaknesses.
In their next match, the Dutch were trailing 2–1 to Australia in the second half of their second group game, before winning 2–3 with the winning goal from young substitute Memphis Depay.

Ahead of the last game in the group, Van Gaal accused FIFA of "playing tricks" in the scheduling of matches to advantage the home nation, as Brazil were to play their last group match four hours after the Dutch, who they could meet in the round of 16 depending on their result. Brazil manager Luiz Felipe Scolari reacted by saying, "It was FIFA who chose the kick-off time. Some people expressed a view that we were going to choose who we were going to play. Those sorts of comments are either stupid or ill-intentioned." Van Gaal also criticised the referees who had awarded penalties against the Dutch in both of their matches, calling the decisions "unjustified" and "incorrect".

The Dutch won their last group match against Chile 2–0 to advance through as group winners. They then defeated Mexico 2–1 in the round of 16, coming behind from a Giovani dos Santos goal in the 45th minute, with Wesley Sneijder and Klaas-Jan Huntelaar scoring in the 89th and 90+2 minutes respectively.

During their quarter-final match against Costa Rica in the World Cup, Van Gaal made the decision to substitute first-choice goalkeeper Jasper Cillessen for Tim Krul in the final minute of extra time; as Krul had not played at all in the Netherlands' four prior matches at the tournament, Van Gaal saved one of his three allowed substitutions to bring Krul on. This decision paid off, as Krul saved two of the Costa Rican penalties to send the Netherlands through to the semi-finals to face Argentina. The Dutch team lost to Argentina in another penalty shootout. Van Gaal ended his tenure as Netherlands manager on 12 July 2014 when the Dutch beat the hosts Brazil 3–0 in the third/fourth place play-off match with goals from Robin van Persie, Daley Blind and Georginio Wijnaldum.

Manchester United (2014–2016)
Van Gaal was confirmed to replace David Moyes as the new manager for Manchester United on 19 May 2014, becoming the club's first manager from outside the British Isles. He signed a three-year contract coming into effect after the 2014 World Cup. He named Ryan Giggs as his assistant manager, Marcel Bout as assistant coach, specialising in oppositional scouting and Frans Hoek as goalkeeping coach. Albert Stuivenberg was appointed as assistant coach. Van Gaal said he had inherited a "broken" United squad, and that he would give youth a chance. Ed Woodward said Van Gaal had "impressed everyone around the club" and that there was "a real positive energy and buzz around the place".

2014–15 season

Van Gaal's first signings were midfielder Ander Herrera for £29 million, and defender Luke Shaw for £30 million. On 20 August, Argentine defender Marcos Rojo was bought for €20 million from Sporting CP and, on 26 August, United signed Argentine winger Ángel Di María from Real Madrid on a five-year contract. Di María's £59.7 million fee set a new record for a signing by an English club, and took the club's summer spending to a reported £130 million. On transfer deadline day, Van Gaal signed Daley Blind from Ajax for a fee of £14 million and was granted an extension to sign Radamel Falcao on loan from Monaco for a reported £6 million.

On 24 July, Van Gaal managed United for the first time as they beat the LA Galaxy 7–0 in a pre-season friendly, using a 3–5–2 formation. Manchester United won the 2014 International Champions Cup under Van Gaal, winning the final 3–1 against rivals Liverpool on 4 August.

Van Gaal lost his first official game in charge, a 2–1 home defeat to Swansea City in the opening match of the 2014–15 Premier League season. On 26 August, United lost 4–0 to League One side Milton Keynes Dons in the second round of the League Cup; it was United's earliest League Cup exit. He won his first competitive game in United's fourth match of the league season, a 4–0 home victory over Queens Park Rangers, with goals from Di María, Herrera, Wayne Rooney and Juan Mata.

After 10 league matches, United were in ninth place with 13 points and three victories, their worst start to the season since 1986–87 under Ron Atkinson. Their poor run included a 5–3 defeat to newly promoted Leicester City. The squad was suffering from injuries, including to new signings Herrera, Rojo and Falcao. Van Gaal reacted to the poor form by saying that it would take three years to take his United team to their full potential.

On 4 February 2015, Van Gaal was charged by The Football Association (FA) over comments he made about the referee Chris Foy, saying, "Every aspect of a match is against us – the pitch, the referee" during United's goalless draw in an FA Cup fourth-round match against Cambridge United. After a requested hearing with the FA, Van Gaal was cleared of his charges, but was warned of future conduct. On 8 February, Van Gaal was criticised by West Ham United manager Sam Allardyce for his long ball tactics after the Hammers conceded a late equaliser to United. Van Gaal responded to the criticism with statistics which seemed to show that West Ham played more long balls than his side. His tactics were defended by fellow managers Arsène Wenger and Garry Monk.

United's form improved as the season progressed. A run of seven consecutive Premier League wins was part of a ten-match unbeaten run that started with a 1–0 home win over Crystal Palace on 8 November 2014 and was ended by Southampton, who won 1–0 at Old Trafford on 11 January 2015. United completed another sequence of seven league wins in a row between 28 February and 12 April, concluding with an impressive 4–2 defeat of champions and local rivals Manchester City. This was followed by three consecutive losses to Chelsea, Everton and West Bromwich Albion. United were also knocked out at the quarter-final stage of the 2014–15 FA Cup by holders and eventual winners Arsenal, who inflicted a 2–1 home defeat on Van Gaal's team on 9 March.

In his first season, Van Gaal led Manchester United to a fourth-place finish, three places and six points higher than the previous season.

2015–16 season

During the summer transfer window, Van Gaal strengthened his squad by bringing in Memphis Depay from PSV, Matteo Darmian from Torino, Sergio Romero from Sampdoria, Morgan Schneiderlin from Southampton, Bastian Schweinsteiger from Bayern Munich and Anthony Martial from Monaco.

United comfortably defeated Club Brugge in the qualifying round of the 2015–16 Champions League to earn a place in the group stage. Domestically, United were solid in defence and went top of the Premier League at the end of September; however, mixed results followed, leaving them in fourth position going into November. They were eliminated from the League Cup by Championship club Middlesbrough and were eliminated from the Champions League at the group stage on 8 December after a 3–2 loss away to VfL Wolfsburg. They finished third in their group and subsequently dropped down to the UEFA Europa League. Fifteen days later, Van Gaal walked out of a press conference after being questioned about his future, amid speculations of dismissal following a six-game run without a win. He concluded, "I wish you a merry Christmas and maybe also a happy new year when I see you."

The new year began well for the Dutchman with wins against Swansea City, Sheffield United and Liverpool, and a draw against Newcastle United. Manchester United, however, lost to Southampton on 23 January, rekindling rumors about Van Gaal offering to resign, but having his resignation rejected by United executive Ed Woodward.

After a 3–0 defeat away to Tottenham Hotspur on 10 April, several United players reportedly turned on Van Gaal in the dressing room, calling him "clueless" and questioning his tactics after he openly criticized young striker Marcus Rashford and several other players and made several questionable decisions during the match, a result which left United four points off fourth-placed Manchester City.

On 21 May 2016, Van Gaal won his only trophy with Manchester United, the FA Cup, when his side defeated Crystal Palace 2–1 after extra time; Jesse Lingard's winning goal made United match Arsenal's then-record of 12 FA Cups. Two days later, Van Gaal and the Dutch members of his staff were sacked by the club.

Hiatus from managing (2016–2021)
On 17 January 2017, it was announced that Van Gaal had retired "for family reasons". He later said that it was only a sabbatical. He announced his official retirement from football on 12 March 2019. Telstar announced that during the 2021–22 Eerste Divisie, van Gaal would be managing the Telstar squad for one single match as a charity event.

Third stint at the Netherlands national team (2021−2022)
On 4 August 2021, Van Gaal came out of retirement to take charge of the Netherlands national team for a third time. He replaced Frank de Boer, who left the position in June following the team's disappointing Euro 2020 campaign.

Van Gaal's first match in his third stint at the Netherlands national team was a 1–1 draw against Norway on 1 September 2021.

In the 2022 FIFA World Cup, the Netherlands finished top of Group A, then they defeated the United States 3–1 in the round of 16. On 9 December, Van Gaal and his Netherlands side lost again to Argentina on penalties, this time in the quarter-finals. Following their exit from the World Cup, Van Gaal resigned as head coach of the Netherlands national team, after 20 matches without defeat in his third stint.

Personal life
The youngest of nine brothers and sisters, Van Gaal was brought up as a Catholic. His father, a salesman, died when Van Gaal was 11. At the age of 18, Van Gaal met Fernanda Obbes at a Catholic youth group. They married three years later, and had two daughters, Brenda and Renate. In 1994, Obbes died of liver and pancreatic cancer. Van Gaal was mocked by fans of Ajax's opponents for her illness. In 2008, Van Gaal married his current wife, Truus, with whom he shares a holiday home near Albufeira, Algarve, Portugal.

According to The Daily Telegraph, it emerged in 2009 that Van Gaal had lost millions of pounds investing in fraudster Bernie Madoff's Ponzi scheme.

On 3 April 2022, Van Gaal said that he was receiving treatment for prostate cancer. On 12 April 2022, he said that his treatment was successful.

In media
In 2000, Van Gaal appeared in Nike's "The Mission" campaign advertising their Total 90 range of football equipment. In the advert, Van Gaal sends a team of Nike-sponsored players to retrieve a Nike Geo Merlin ball being held in a secure facility by robot ninjas. Oliver Bierhoff protests, "It's just a ball", to which Van Gaal responds, "No! It's rounder!" After the players retrieve the ball, Van Gaal pilots the escape helicopter to safety.

In 2022, Geertjan Lassche made a two-hour documentary about Louis van Gaal, entitled Louis, with the tagline "The man behind the legend". It premiered on 11 April in the Amsterdam Tuschinski Theatre. It was released on 14 April 2022.

Career statistics

Club

Managerial statistics

Honours

Manager
Ajax
Eredivisie: 1993–94, 1994–95, 1995–96
KNVB Cup: 1992–93
Johan Cruyff Shield: 1993, 1994, 1995
UEFA Champions League: 1994–95; runner-up: 1995–96
UEFA Cup: 1991–92
UEFA Super Cup: 1995
Intercontinental Cup: 1995

Barcelona
La Liga: 1997–98, 1998–99
Copa del Rey: 1997–98
UEFA Super Cup: 1997

AZ
Eredivisie: 2008–09

Bayern Munich
Bundesliga: 2009–10
DFB-Pokal: 2009–10
DFL-Supercup: 2010
UEFA Champions League runner-up: 2009–10

Manchester United
FA Cup: 2015–16

Netherlands
FIFA World Cup third place: 2014

Awards and achievements
World Soccer Manager of the Year: 1995
Onze d'Or Coach of the Year: 1995
European Coach of the Year—Sepp Herberger Award: 1995
El País Manager of the Year: 1995
European Coach of the Season: 1994–95
Rinus Michels Award: 2007, 2009
Dutch Sports Coach of the Year: 2009, 2014
Die Sprachwahrer des Jahres (3rd place): 2009
Football Manager of the Year (Germany): 2010
Anton Geesink Award: 2015
Dutch Lifetime Achievement Award: 2017
France Football 18th Greatest Manager of All Time: 2019

Orders
Knight of the Order of Orange-Nassau: 1997

Publications
 De trainer en de totale mens, Leipzig, Leibniz-Blätter-Verlag, 2021.

See also
 List of European Cup and UEFA Champions League winning managers
 List of UEFA Cup winning managers
List of investors in Bernard L. Madoff Securities

References

External links

 
Profile and stats at Voetbal International 
CV Louis van Gaal 
Van Gaal: My football philosophy, from FIFA.com
Profile and stats on RAFC History 

1951 births
Living people
Footballers from Amsterdam
Dutch footballers
Association football midfielders
AFC Ajax players
Royal Antwerp F.C. players
SC Telstar players
Sparta Rotterdam players
AZ Alkmaar players
Belgian Pro League players
Eredivisie players
Dutch expatriate footballers
Dutch expatriate sportspeople in Belgium
Expatriate footballers in Belgium
Dutch football managers
AFC Ajax managers
FC Barcelona managers
Netherlands national football team managers
Directors of football clubs in the Netherlands
AFC Ajax non-playing staff
AZ Alkmaar managers
FC Bayern Munich managers
Manchester United F.C. managers
UEFA Cup winning managers
UEFA Champions League winning managers
FA Cup winning managers
2014 FIFA World Cup managers
Eredivisie managers
La Liga managers
Bundesliga managers
Premier League managers
Rinus Michels Award winners
Dutch expatriate football managers
Dutch expatriate sportspeople in Spain
Dutch expatriate sportspeople in Germany
Dutch expatriate sportspeople in England
Expatriate football managers in Spain
Expatriate football managers in Germany
Expatriate football managers in England
Officers of the Order of Orange-Nassau
AZ Alkmaar non-playing staff
2022 FIFA World Cup managers